John Eveleigh  was an English surveyor and architect in Bath.

He began his practice in Bath in the 1780s, but went bankrupt after the failure of the Bath City Bank and moved to Plymouth.

List of works

 Camden Crescent, Bath (1788)
 32-44 Caledonia Place, Bristol (1788)
 Summer Hill Place, Sion Hill, Bath (1789)
 Beaufort Buildings, London Road, Bath (1790)
 St Catherine's Hermitage, Lansdown, Bath (1791)
 Grosvenor Place, Bath (1791)
 Somerset Place, Bath (1791)
 Lambridge Place, Bath (1792)
 Plymouth Guildhall (1800)

References

 H.M. Colvin, A Biographical Dictionary of British Architects, 1600-1840 (1997) 
 M. Forsyth, Bath, Pevsner Architectural Guides (2003) 

Year of birth missing
Year of death missing
18th-century English architects
Architects from Bath, Somerset